Michael A. McLachlan (born May 18, 1958) is an American politician from Danbury, Connecticut. He was Deputy Minority Leader of the Connecticut State Senate for the Republican Party. First elected in 2008, he represented the 24th District which includes Bethel, Danbury, New Fairfield and Sherman. In the 2018 Midterm Elections, he lost re-election to Democrat Julie Kushner.

References

External links
Connecticut Senate Republicans
Michael McLachlan's Biography at Vote Smart

1958 births
Republican Party Connecticut state senators
Living people
Politicians from Danbury, Connecticut